Peter Porte (born March 31, 1984) is an American actor, known for the soap opera The Young and the Restless, the films It's Not Porn... and Sutures, and the sitcom Baby Daddy playing Brad Walker, who is married to Bonnie Wheeler. He also played Josh on the Netflix comedy series Uncoupled opposite Neil Patrick Harris.

Early life and education
Porte grew up in Greenwood Lake, New York and always wanted to be an actor. Porte first got into acting in the third grade when he appeared in a Christopher Columbus pageant. According to Porte, he only got the role because his mother, who is from Poland, made his costume out of "traditional Polish garb." Porte continued acting throughout high school and ultimately decided to become a professional actor. Porte graduated from George F. Baker High School in 2002. He earned a BFA in Acting at New York University's Tisch School of the Arts. Porte then went onto study at the Royal Academy of Dramatic Art in London.

Personal life
On October 7, 2018, Porte married Jacob Villere in a ceremony held in New Orleans.

Career
Though he always considered himself an actor, Porte started his career as a model. He's done shows in Milan and Paris.

Toured with the Broadway National Touring Company of Mamma Mia!, after which he made the move to Los Angeles. On stage, performing five seasons with the critically acclaimed For the Record company. Videos on the website Funny or Die.

Lead and supporting roles in film and hit network television shows including: Cold Case, CSI: Miami, Medium, The New Normal and Parks and Recreation. In 2011, he joined the cast of The Young and the Restless as a series regular, playing the role of Ricky Williams. Following his run on the series, he had recurring roles in Devious Maids for the Lifetime Network and in Baby Daddy for FreeForm. He has also had roles in episodes of the NBC comedy Telenovela, CBS Mom and NCIS: LA, and Fox New Girl.

Porte starred in the indie thriller The Good Nanny and the made-for-television movie A Cinderella Christmas for ION Television, while recurring on the comedy web series Living with Models, and starring in the world premiere of Eve Ensler's play O.P.C. at the American Repertory Theatre.

Porte starred as a surfer in the 2017 Hallmark movie, Love at the Shore. He also starred in the 2018 film, Love, Once and Always and 2019 film Rome in Love for Hallmark.

In 2020, he starred as one of the gay leads in the landmark production Dashing in December, one of the first LGBTQ+ centered Christmas romance movies produced for mainstream television.

In 2022, he played Josh on the hit Netflix comedy series Uncoupled opposite Neil Patrick Harris.

Filmography

References

External links

1985 births
American gay actors
Living people
Male actors from New York City
Male models from New York (state)
American male soap opera actors
Tisch School of the Arts alumni